The Battle of Dogger Bank is the name of a battle which took place on 17 June 1696 as part of the War of the Grand Alliance. It was a victory for a French force of seven ships over a Dutch force of five ships and the convoy it was escorting.

The battle
The French privateer Jean Bart found a Dutch convoy of 112 merchant ships, escorted by five Dutch ships near Dogger Bank.

The French had more warships and more cannons than the Dutch. Furthermore, the French crews were very experienced and led by an exceptional commander, so the outcome of the battle was very predictable. However, the French had to hurry because a large English squadron, under Admiral John Benbow, was aware of the French presence and was looking for them.

The battle started on 19:00, when Jean Bart on the Maure attacked the Dutch flagship, the Raadhuis-van-Haarlem. the Dutch fought valiantly for three hours until their captain was killed. Then they surrendered and so did the 4 other ships, one after another.

Jean Bart captured and burned 25 merchant ships until Benbow's squadron of 18 ships approached. The French squadron fled towards Denmark. They remained there until July and then slipped through the allied lines into Dunkirk with 1200 prisoners, on 27 September.

Ships involved

France
 Maure, frigate, 54 cannons, flagship of captain Jean Bart: 15 killed, 16 wounded.
 Adroit, frigate, 44 cannons
 Mignon, frigate, 44 cannons
 Jersey, frigate, 40 cannons 
 Comte, frigate, 40 cannons
 Alcyon, frigate, 38 cannons
 Milfort, frigate, 36 cannons
 Tigre, fire ship
 Saint Jean, long boat
 Deux Frères, long boat
 Lamberly, 8 cannons, privateer
 Bonne Espérance, 6 cannons, privateer

Netherlands
 Raadhuis-van-Haarlem, 44 cannons, flagship of captain Rutger Bucking (killed): captured and burnt
 Comte de Solnis, 38 cannons, captured
 Wedam, 38 cannons, captured and burnt
 ?, 24 cannons, captured and burnt
 ?, 24 cannons, captured and burnt
 112 merchant ships, of which 25 were captured and bur

Bibliography
 Jean-Jacques Michaud, "Le Soleil de glace", revue Navires et Histoire, numéro 36, June/July 2006.

Conflicts in 1696
Dogger Bank (1696)
Dogger Bank (1696)
Dogger Bank (1696)
Military history of the North Sea
1696 in Europe